Tinli may refer to:
Tinli, Jabrayil, Azerbaijan
Tinli, Qubadli, Azerbaijan